Poland competed at the 2016 Winter Youth Olympics in Lillehammer, Norway from 12 to 21 February 2016. The Polish Olympic Committee revealed the team at 18 January 2016.

Medalists in mixed NOCs events

Alpine skiing

Boys

Girls

Biathlon

Boys

Girls

Mixed

Cross-country skiing

Boys

Girls

Ice hockey

Luge

Boys

Girls

Team

Nordic combined 

Individual

Nordic mixed team

Ski jumping

Individual

Team

Snowboarding

Snowboard cross

Speed skating

Boys

Girls

Mixed team sprint

See also
Poland at the 2016 Summer Olympics

References

2016 in Polish sport
Nations at the 2016 Winter Youth Olympics
Poland at the Youth Olympics